Vietnamese martial arts (Vocotruyen Vietnam)  competition at the 2016 Asian Beach Games was held in Da Nang, Vietnam from 29 September to 2 October 2016 at Bien Dong park.

Medalists

Men

Women

Medal table

Results

Men

50 kg

55 kg

60 kg

65 kg

70 kg

Open

Women

48 kg

52 kg

56 kg

60 kg

Open

References

External links 
Official website

2016 Asian Beach Games events